Free Fall is the first full-length studio album by Swedish heavy metal songwriter, guitarist, multi-instrumentalist and producer Magnus Karlsson.

It was released under the project name Magnus Karlsson's Free Fall on June 11, 2013 in North America and June 14 in Europe by Frontiers Records and features many guest singers who worked with Magnus on his many previous projects, including Russell Allen (one of the singers of the duo Allen/Lande), Ralf Scheepers (vocalist of Primal Fear, Magnus current band), Tony Harnell (who worked with Magnus in the band Starbreaker), Rickard Bengtsson (former bandmate from Last Tribe), Mark Boals (who worked with Magnus in the project The Codex), Mike Andersson (who worked with Magnus in the project Planet Alliance) and some other famous friends like David Readman (Pink Cream 69, Voodoo Circle), Rick Altzi (At Vance, Masterplan) and Herman Saming (A.C.T).

Magnus also sings three tracks on the album himself and Daniel Flores (who also worked with Magnus in the project The Codex) recorded the drums.

Track listing

Personnel
 Magnus Karlsson - Guitar, Bass Guitar, Keyboards & Producer, Backing vocals, Lead vocals on tracks 3, 8, 12 & 13
 Daniel Flores - Drums, Mixing

Guests Singers

Russell Allen (Symphony X, Allen-Lande, Adrenaline Mob) - lead vocals on track 1
 Ralf Scheepers (Primal Fear, ex-Gamma Ray) - lead vocals on track 2
 Tony Harnell (TNT, Starbreaker, Westworld) - lead vocals on track 4
 Rick Altzi (At Vance, Masterplan, ex-Thunderstone) - lead vocals on track 5 
 David Readman (Pink Cream 69, ex-Voodoo Circle, ex-Adagio) - lead vocals on track 6
 Mark Boals (The Codex, ex-Yngwie Malmsteen band, ex-Royal Hunt) - lead vocals on track 7 
 Rickard Bengtsson (Last Tribe) - lead vocals on track 9
 Herman Saming (A.C.T) - lead vocals on track 10 
 Mike Andersson (Planet Alliance, Cloudscape, Full Force) - lead vocals on track 11

References

2013 debut albums
Frontiers Records albums